The 1999 Sugar Bowl was an American college football bowl game played on January 1, 1999. It was the 65th edition of the Sugar Bowl and featured the Ohio State Buckeyes, and the Texas A&M Aggies. Ohio State entered the game ranked number 4 in the BCS at 10–1, whereas Texas A&M entered the game at 11–2, and ranked number 6 in the BCS. Sponsored by Nokia, the game was officially known as the Nokia Sugar Bowl.

Teams
The Sugar Bowl during the BCS era usually selected the SEC champion, however the winner of the SEC, Tennessee was selected to play in the Fiesta Bowl for the national title. The next-highest ranked SEC team, Florida was selected to play in Orange Bowl instead, leaving no SEC representatives for the Sugar Bowl. As a result, Big 12 champion Texas A&M and Big Ten co-champion Ohio State were selected.

Texas A&M Aggies

Texas A&M defeated Kansas State in the 1998 Big 12 Championship Game to earn a BCS berth as their conference's champion. Texas A&M entered the bowl with an 11–2 record (7–1 in conference).

Ohio State Buckeyes

Ohio State ended up in a three-way tie for first place in the Big Ten with Michigan and Wisconsin. At the time, the Big Ten awarded the Rose Bowl invitation to the tied team which had gone the longest period of time without an invitation: Michigan had been in the 1998 Rose Bowl, Ohio State had been in the 1997 Rose Bowl, while Wisconsin had last been in the 1994 Rose Bowl, meaning the Badgers would get the invitation. Ohio State entered the bowl with a 10–1 record (7–1 in conference).

Game summary
Texas A&M scored first on a 9-yard touchdown run by Dante Hall to open the game 7–0. Joe Germaine threw a 19-yard touchdown pass to Reggie Germany to tie the game at 7–7. Later in the quarter, running back Joe Montgomery rushed 10 yards for a touchdown, and Ohio State opened up a 14–7 lead.

Derek Ross blocked an A&M punt, that Kevin Griffin returned 16 yards for a touchdown. Ohio State led 21–7 after the first quarter. Ohio State kicked a 31-yard field goal in the second quarter to open up a 24–7 halftime lead. Texas A&M closed to 24–14 on a 7-yard touchdown pass from Branndon Stewart to Leroy Hodge. Ohio State's defense was stout throughout the contest, and they held on to win, 24–14.

Scoring summary

Statistics

References

Sugar Bowl
Sugar Bowl
Ohio State Buckeyes football bowl games
Texas A&M Aggies football bowl games
Sugar Bowl
Sugar Bowl